Robert Allen Williams (January 2, 1930 – May 26, 2016) was an American football quarterback in the National Football League (NFL).

Early years
Williams graduated from Loyola Blakefield High School in Towson, Maryland in 1948. Williams attended Notre Dame on an athletic scholarship, where, as a nineteen-year-old junior quarterback, he guided Notre Dame to an undefeated season with 10 wins and no losses. Williams won the National Championship for Frank Leahy's 1949 team. Williams finished fifth in voting for the Heisman Trophy in 1949 and sixth in 1950. Bob Williams holds the school mark for highest passing efficiency rating for a season (minimum 50 completions) with a 159.1 rating in 1949, when he was 83 of 147 for 1,374 yards and 16 TD's. Williams was first team on the 1949 College Football All-America Team and the 1950 College Football All-America Team. He was awarded the Nils V. "Swede" Nelson Award in 1950. Williams was inducted into the College Football Hall of Fame in 1988.

Professional career
Williams was the second overall selection in the 1951 NFL Draft by the Chicago Bears. He played professionally in 1951, 1952 and 1955.

Death
Williams died on May 26, 2016 at a retirement home in Timonium, Maryland from Parkinson's disease, aged 86.

See also
 List of NCAA major college football yearly passing leaders

References

External links
NFL.com player page

1930 births
2016 deaths
All-American college football players
American football quarterbacks
Chicago Bears players
College Football Hall of Fame inductees
Notre Dame Fighting Irish football players
Sportspeople from Cumberland, Maryland